Heded is a village in the Jariban District, Mudug region, Puntland, north-central Somalia.The village lies in an arid landscape with sparse and scattered vegetation. 
There are no proper road connections, but vehicle tracks lead from the village in several directions.

External links
Satellite view of Heded (zoomable)
Map of Jariban District with the location of Heded

Populated places in Mudug